The 1952 Groundhog Day Storm was the only Atlantic tropical cyclone on record in February. First observed in the western Caribbean Sea on February 2 as a non-frontal low, it moved rapidly throughout its duration and struck southwestern Florida early the next day as a gale-force storm. In the state, the winds damaged some crops and power lines, but no serious damage was reported. The system became a tropical storm after emerging over the Atlantic Ocean before quickly transitioning into an extratropical cyclone on February 4. Strong winds and waves washed a freighter ashore, but no injuries were related to the event. Subsequently, the storm brushed eastern New England, causing minor power outages, before it moved inland near Maine. There were no reported fatalities related to the storm.

Meteorological history

On February 2, Groundhog Day, a disturbance was first observed in the western Caribbean Sea. After passing near Cancún along the Yucatan Peninsula, it turned northeastward and brushed the northwest coast of Cuba. Early on February 3 the storm approached Key West, and shortly thereafter moved ashore near Cape Sable, Florida. It quickly crossed the state, passing near Miami before emerging into the western Atlantic Ocean.

After leaving Florida, the storm continued rapidly northeastward and transitioned into a tropical cyclone. On February 4 it completed the transition into an extratropical cyclone off the coast of North Carolina. Around that time, gale-force winds extended  to the east of the center. Later that day, it passed over Cape Cod, and early on February 5 it moved into eastern Maine. The Hurricane Research Division assessed the storm as losing its identity shortly thereafter, over New Brunswick. However, a map produced by the U.S. Weather Bureau indicated that the storm continued northward into the Gulf of Saint Lawrence and later crossed eastern Quebec and Labrador. At that point, the Weather Bureau track ended, and as such the ultimate fate of the storm is unknown.

Impact and records
Residents and tourists in southern Florida were unprepared for the unusual off-season storm. Winds of up to  spread across the area, causing damage to windows and power lines. The storm dropped  of precipitation along its path; the combination of unseasonable rainfall and winds resulted in crop damage in Miami-Dade County.

After the storm moved into the western Atlantic, the Miami U.S. Weather Bureau issued storm warnings for the North Carolina coastline from Wilmington to Cape Hatteras; the region was warned to prepare for strong winds. The agency also issued a small craft advisory southward through Charleston, South Carolina. The combination of the winds and rough waves drove a freighter ashore along Portsmouth Island in the Outer Banks, after the engine was damaged when water entered the fuel line. The 26 person crew initially planned to evacuate, but they later decided to stay on the freighter as the U.S. Coast Guard were deployed to assist. The seas damaged a portion of the ship, but the entire crew was rescued without any injuries. The storm later brushed New England, bringing rain, fog, warmer temperatures, and gusty winds. The combination resulted in downed power poles and tree limbs, leaving 10,000 houses without electricity.

The storm was described as a "freak", forming about three months after the end of the hurricane season. The chief forecaster at Miami U.S. Weather Bureau, Grady Norton, remarked that he was unsure how the cyclone developed. It is the only tropical or subtropical storm on record during February, and was the earliest tropical cyclone to strike the United States. Its structure initially was uncertain, and the storm was not included in the 1952 Atlantic hurricane season summary published by the Miami Weather Bureau office. Ultimately it was included in the tropical cyclone database. Had it been operationally treated as a tropical cyclone, it would have been named Tropical Storm Able.

See also

 List of off-season Atlantic hurricanes
 List of Florida hurricanes (1950–1974)
 Tropical Storm Ana (2015) – The earliest tropical cyclone on record to make landfall on the United States, in any given year
 Tropical Storm Alex (2022) - A storm with a similar track.

References

1952 Atlantic hurricane season
Atlantic tropical storms
Off-season Atlantic tropical cyclones
Atlantic hurricanes in Mexico
Hurricanes in Florida
1952 natural disasters in the United States
February 1952 events in North America
Groundhog Day